East Fremantle Oval (known under a sponsorship agreement as New Choice Homes Park and nicknamed "Shark Park",) is an Australian rules football ground located in East Fremantle, Western Australia. The ground was opened in 1906, and underwent a large redevelopment in 1953. It current serves as the home ground of the East Fremantle Football Club in the West Australian Football League (WAFL).

History
In 1903, the East Fremantle Municipal Council received two grants of land, totalling 15 acres, for the establishment of a recreation reserve near the Canning Road. A sum of £3,579 over three years was expended on improvements to the reserve, which including the establishment of a bowling green, bandstand, croquet lawn, tennis courts and cricket pitch. The football ground was completed in 1906, and opened by the Governor of Western Australia, Sir Frederick Bedford, on 2 June 1906. The Western Mail reported: "The ground had been laid out in good taste, and with a view to the requirements of the public." The first WAFA game at the ground was held on Saturday, 26 May 1906, with  defeating North Fremantle by 80 points, 15.11 (101) to 3.3 (21).

The ground was also utilised by the East Fremantle Lacrosse Club as one of its home venues, and hosted a "Test match" between two Fremantle and Perth sides in 1908.

In 1924, the ground hosted what was to be the final edition of the West Australian State Championship with  defeating Goldfields Football League side Boulder City 12.12 (84) to 8.13 (61). Pat Rodriguez kicked seven goals for the Maroons.

Supported by the East Fremantle Town Council, the ground underwent extensive redevelopment from 1949 to 1953. The redeveloped ground was opened by William Wauhop, the Mayor of East Fremantle, on 25 April 1953, with the president, Pat Rodriguez, and secretary, Billy Orr, of the WANFL in attendance. The first match on the new ground was played on the same date, with East Fremantle defeating  by two points.

The ground had a reputation, particularly before the construction of the public stand in 1971, as one of the windiest grounds in the competition. The West Australian said after the first game in 1953: "Visiting teams are certain to be worried by the wind factor at East Fremantle Oval, which is comparatively high and unsheltered from sea breezes."

Pink Floyd played a concert at the ground on 24 February 1988 as part of their A Momentary Lapse of Reason Tour.

In 1995, the ground hosted the Fremantle Football Club's first-ever game against another Australian Football League club – a practice match against  on 11 February, with the Dockers winning 14.11 (95) to 6.9 (45) in front of a crowd of 15,921 people. The ground also hosted a match in the 1995 Ansett Cup, with  defeating Fremantle 19.7 (121) to 13.8 (86) with a crowd of 10,028 people. Stewart Loewe kicked nine goals.

In July 2021, a $25 million redevelopment of East Fremantle Oval was announced. The playing surface is to be renewed, new change rooms built to better accommodate women's football and community facilities are to be incorporated in the redevelopment with work expected to begin in October 2021 and take 2 years. During the redevelopment, East Fremantle will relocate their home games to the WACA Ground.

References

External links

 
 Satellite image of East Fremantle Oval

Further reading
 (1996) East Fremantle Oval feasibility study / Town of East Fremantle, East Fremantle Sharks. East Fremantle, W.A.: The Town,.

West Australian Football League grounds
Sports venues in Perth, Western Australia
East Fremantle Football Club
Town of East Fremantle